The 1990 Dunhill Cup was the sixth Dunhill Cup. It was a team tournament featuring 16 countries, each represented by three players. The Cup was played 11–14 October at the Old Course at St Andrews in Scotland. The sponsor was the Alfred Dunhill company. The Irish team of David Feherty, Ronan Rafferty, Philip Walton beat the English team of Richard Boxall, Howard Clark, and Mark James in the final. It was the second win in the Dunhill Cup for Ireland. (As in the World Cup, Ireland was represented by a combined Ireland and Northern Ireland team.)

Format
The Cup was played as a single-elimination, match play event played over four days. The top eight teams were seeded with the remaining teams randomly placed in the bracket. In each match, the three players were paired with their opponents and played 18 holes at medal match play. Tied matches were extended to a sudden-death playoff only if they affected the outcome between the two teams.

Bracket

Round by round scores

First round
Source:

Quarter-finals
Source:

Semi-finals
Source:

Final
Source:

Feherty won on third playoff hole.

Third place
Source:

Team results

Player results

References

Alfred Dunhill Cup
Dunhill Cup
Dunhill Cup
Dunhill Cup